The Institute for Bird Populations (IBP), based in Petaluma, California is a non-profit organization dedicated to studying and monitoring bird populations, and providing land managers and policy makers with information needed to better manage those populations.

History 

The Institute was founded in 1989 by Dr. David DeSante to develop and coordinate the Monitoring Avian Productivity and Survivorship Program (MAPS), a network of approximately 500 standardized bird banding stations studying breeding bird populations across North America.

In June 2015, the Institute launched a website, the Vital Rates of North American Landbirds, tracking the population of 150 bird species in North America, to raise awareness about the population declines of those species.

Description 

Scientists at the institute develop standardized bird monitoring techniques and tools for land managers and researchers studying bird populations, coordinate large-scale networks for monitoring vital rates of birds, conduct original research on the abundance, distribution, and ecology of birds, and convey their findings in scientific papers and reports to public and private land managers. The Institute also trains individuals, organizations, and agencies in the United States and abroad, in effective bird monitoring techniques.

Initiatives 

 Monitoring Avian Productivity and Survivorship Program (MAPS)
 Monitoreo de Sobreviviencia Invernal Program (MoSI): a cooperative effort among agencies, organizations, and individual bird-banders in Mexico, Central America, and the Caribbean to monitor overwintering survival rates of both Neotropical migratory and resident bird species
 Research and conservation efforts on behalf of birds in California's Sierra Nevada mountains (IBP's Sierra Nevada Bird Observatory)
 Development and deployment of bird monitoring programs on public lands
 Publication of Bird Populations, an online, peer-reviewed journal of global avian research
 2015: Bird Genoscape Project, led by UCLA, first maps identifying the population-specific migration paths of several bird species to fix conservation priorities.
 Creation and maintenance of a list of four- and six-letter abbreviations for North and Central American birds.

References

External links
 
 Vital Rates of North American Landbirds

Ornithological organizations in the United States
Environmental organizations based in the San Francisco Bay Area
Zoological research institutes
Research institutes in the San Francisco Bay Area
Bird observatories in the United States
Nature conservation organizations based in the United States
Environmental organizations established in 1989
1989 establishments in California
Organizations based in Marin County, California